Cosme Torres Espinoza was the ambassador of Cuba to Zimbabwe until 2009.  He previously served as deputy chief of the Cuban Interests Section in Washington, DC.

References

 http://www.granma.cubaweb.cu/2008/11/21/cubamundo/artic09.html

Cuban diplomats
Ambassadors of Cuba to Zimbabwe
Living people
Year of birth missing (living people)